Damdinjavyn Bandi (25 February 1942 – 10 January 2018) was a Mongolian boxer. He competed at the 1972 Summer Olympics and the 1976 Summer Olympics.

References

1942 births
2018 deaths
Mongolian male boxers
Olympic boxers of Mongolia
Boxers at the 1972 Summer Olympics
Boxers at the 1976 Summer Olympics
Place of birth missing
Welterweight boxers
20th-century Mongolian people